Schinia crotchii is a moth of the family Noctuidae. It is found from southeastern Arizona west to the Peninsular Ranges of southern California and north in south-eastern Washington and southern Idaho.

It was formerly considered a synonym of Schinia cupes.

The wingspan is about 26 mm.

The larvae feed on Castilleja exserta.

External links
Images
Systematics of Schinia cupes (Grote) complex: Revised status of Schinia crotchii (Hy. Edwards) (Lepidoptera: Noctuidae: Heliothinae)

Schinia
Moths of North America
Moths described in 1875